Two Maids is an American cleaning franchise based in Birmingham, Alabama. The company was ranked #4 as a top job creator by Inc. in 2013. It is also an Inc. 5000 company, ranking both for Top 100 Alabama Companies and Top 100 Consumer Products & Services Companies.

History
Two Maids was established in 2003 by Ron Holt. Holt purchased a small cleaning business that he branded into Two Maids The company grew into 12 company-owned locations, with its first franchise location being in Tampa, Florida. As of 2019, the company serves 91 markets across the United States.

Partnership
The company is an active participant in Cleaning For A Reason, a national non-profit that partners with local cleaning businesses to provide cleaning services to cancer patients. In 2012, they were named Maid Service of the Year by Cleaning For A Reason for their work with the charity.

Recognition
The company has been named a Stevie Award finalist in the Company of the Year – Diversified Services category for The 2015 American Business Awards. In 2016, Inc. Magazine named Two Maids the fastest-growing cleaning company in America. The residential cleaning service was ranked #11 on Entrepreneur magazine's Top 100 New Franchises list in 2018 and was rated in the top two-thirds of the overall rankings on Entrepreneurs 2019 list.

References

External links
Two Maids Website

Franchises
Business services companies established in 2003
Cleaning companies of the United States
Companies based in Birmingham, Alabama